The 2012–13 FC St. Pauli season was the 102nd season in the club's football history. In 2012–13 the club played in the 2. Bundesliga, the second tier of German football. It was the clubs second consecutive season in the league, having played at this level since 2011–12, after it was relegated from the Bundesliga in 2012.

The club also took part in the 2012–13 edition of the DFB-Pokal, the German Cup, where it reached the second round and faced Bundesliga side VfB Stuttgart.

Matches

Legend

Friendly matches

2. Bundesliga

DFB-Pokal

Squad and statistics

|}

Sources

External links
 2012–13 FC St. Pauli season at Weltfussball.de 
 2012–13 FC St. Pauli season at kicker.de 
 2012–13 FC St. Pauli season at Fussballdaten.de 

St. Pauli
FC St. Pauli seasons